The 37th Goya Awards ceremony, presented by the Academy of Cinematographic Arts and Sciences of Spain, took place at the FIBES Conference and Exhibition Centre in Seville, Andalusia on 11 February 2023.

Background 
On 31 May 2022, Seville was revealed as the host city, with the awards thereby set to return to the Andalusian capital after the 33rd edition. On 29 June 2022, the specific date of 11 February was disclosed by the academy president  and the Mayor of Seville Antonio Muñoz, alongside with the announcement of the venue (the FIBES Conference and Exhibition Centre) and the reported increase from 4 to 5 nominations per category. In November 2022 Clara Lago and Antonio de la Torre were announced as the co-hosts of the gala, to be directed by Tinet Rubira and Ángel Custodio, with Fernando Pérez helming the screenwriting team.

The nominations were announced on 1 December 2022 by actresses Blanca Portillo and Nora Navas, The Beasts led the nominations with seventeen, followed by Prison 77 with sixteen and Alcarràs and Lullaby, both with eleven. Director Carlos Saura, recipient of the Honorary Goya Award, passed away on 10 February 2023, a day before the awards. He was honored posthumously during the ceremony.

Rodrigo Sorogoyen's thriller The Beasts received the most awards during the ceremony with nine wins, including Best Film. The bronze Goya statuettes were brownish instead of featuring their traditional greenish finishing as a consequence of the use of recycled bronze.

The ceremony, broadcast on La 1, was viewed by 2.684.000 million people (23,4%), being the most watched program at the primetime slot of the day.

Winners and nominees 

The winners and nominees are listed as follows:

Honorary Goya 

 Carlos Saura

International Goya Award 
 Juliette Binoche

Films with multiple nominations

Presenters and performers
The following individuals, listed in order of appearance, presented awards or performed musical numbers.

Presenters

Performers

In Memoriam
The In Memoriam tribute, accompanied by a musical performing, paid tribute to the following individuals: Juan Diego, Agustí Villaronga, Silvia Gambino, José Guirao, Javier Marías, Antonio Ibáñez, Beatriz Álvarez Guerra, Carlos Saura, Fernando Estrella, Chete Lera, Eugenio Martín, Fernando Fernández, Juan Antonio Quintana, Luis Marín, Paco Merino, Pep Guinyol, Rosa Guiñón, and Rosa Mariscal between others.

See also
 10th Feroz Awards
 15th Gaudí Awards
 2nd Carmen Awards

References

External links 
 Gala of the 37th Goya Awards on RTVE Play
 

2023 in Spain
2020s in Andalusia
Goya Awards